Pozzuolo Martesana is a railway station in Italy. Located on the Milan–Venice railway, it serves the municipality of Pozzuolo Martesana.

Services
Pozzuolo Martesana is served by lines S5 and S6 of the Milan suburban railway network, operated by the Lombard railway company Trenord.

See also
 Milan suburban railway network

References

External links

Railway stations in Lombardy
Milan S Lines stations
Railway stations opened in 2009